Diyab Obeid (1911 – 18 February 1984) was an Israeli Arab politician who served as a member of the Knesset for Cooperation and Brotherhood and Cooperation and Development between 1961 and 1974.

Born in Tayibe during the Ottoman era, Obeid worked as a merchant in Tulkarm until 1936, when he moved to Jaffa, where he was a member of the local Merchants Council. In 1948 he moved to Tayibe, where he worked in agriculture for three years. In 1951 he was elected to Tayibe local council, which he remained a member of until 1958.

In 1961 he was elected to the Knesset on the Cooperation and Brotherhood list. He was re-elected in 1965 and 1969, during which time the party briefly merged into Cooperation and Development, before losing his seat in the 1973 elections.

In 1974 he was appointed an advisor to the Minister of Agriculture. He died in 1984.

References

External links

1911 births
1984 deaths
People from Tayibe
Arab people in Mandatory Palestine
20th-century Israeli businesspeople
Arab members of the Knesset
Israeli civil servants
Cooperation and Development politicians
Cooperation and Brotherhood politicians
Arabs in Ottoman Palestine
Members of the 5th Knesset (1961–1965)
Members of the 6th Knesset (1965–1969)
Members of the 7th Knesset (1969–1974)